Viason Chin is a populated place situated in Pima County, Arizona, United States. It is a small village located on the San Xavier Indian Reservation, approximately two miles southeast of Pisinemo, and about one and a quarter miles east-northeast of Hali Murk. Historically, it has also been known as Baileys, Chico Baileys, Hardimui, Santi Vaya, Via Santee, Viasoh Chin, and Visan Chin. Viason Chin's name became official as a decision by the Board on Geographic Names in 1941. In the O'odham language, viason chin means "mouth of erosion".

Notes

References

Populated places in Pima County, Arizona